Eternity is a controversial 1943 Chinese film made in Japanese-occupied Shanghai during the Second World War. The film was a collaborative effort between the Japanese-controlled Manchukuo Film Association and Chinese filmmakers that remained in Shanghai under the Japanese-controlled Zhonglian Productions ("United China") brand.

Telling the story of Lin Zexu and the First Opium War, the film was designed by producers Kawakita Nagamasa and Zhang Shankun to offer "an interpretive fluidity to accommodate every spectator's ideological position." For Japanese audiences, the film could be read as anti-Western, as promoting the ostensibly "anti-colonialist" agenda of the Greater East Asian Co-Prosperity Sphere.  To Chinese audiences, on the other hand, the film promoted a spirit of resistance to a foreign enemy – namely, Japan – and upon its release garnered the largest audience in Chinese cinematic history. Ultimately the film (and the Shanghai filmmakers) was seen as tools of the enemy once the war was over, with many involved in the production (notably directors Bu Wancang, Ma-Xu Weibang, and Zhu Shilin) eventually moving to Hong Kong due to the hostile environment.

Cast 
 Chen Yunshang as Zhang Jingxian
 Li Xianglan (Japanese name Yamaguchi Yoshiko)
 Gao Zhanfei as Lin Zexu
 Yuan Meiyun
 Wang Yin

Production history 
In 1939, the Japanese had formed the China Movie Company ("Zhongdian") to make Japanese propaganda shorts. By 1941, Zhongdian signed a deal with the head of the Xinhua Film Company, Zhang Shankun, followed quickly by two other deals with the Yihua Film Company and the Guohua Film Company.

Casting 
The film was cast primarily with Chinese actors out of (what remained) of the Shanghai studio system (now under the control of Zhonglian). One major star cast, however, was the Manchuria-born Japanese actress Yoshiko Yamaguchi. Though she had already starred in several Chinese features under her Chinese name of Li Xianglan, Yamaguchi was a seeming outlier in the cast of Eternity. She was, therefore, an indication of the control the Japanese exercised over the Chinese film industry in Shanghai. (ref "Her Traces are Found Everywhere" 227, Shelly Stevenson, in Cinema and Urban Culture in Shanghai 1922-1943) Helped by the massive pop hits, "Candy-Peddling Song" (賣糖歌) and "Quitting (opium) Song" (戒煙歌), the film would catapult Li into stardom, as her earlier works had been in films so blatantly pro-Japanese, as to turn off most of the Chinese audience (Shelly, 227).

Notes

References
 Fu, Poshek "Resistance in Collaboration: Chinese Cinema in Occupied Shanghai" in Chinese Collaboration with Japan, 1932-1945: The Limits of Accommodation. David, Barrett P. ed.  (Stanford:  Stanford University Press, 2001)
Yoshiko Yamaguchi. "Fragrant Orchid: The Story of My Early Life." Trans. Chia-ning Chang (Honolulu: University of Hawai'i Pres, 2015)

External links 
 
 Eternity from the Chinese Movie Database

1943 films
Films set in 19th-century Qing dynasty
1940s Mandarin-language films
Films directed by Bu Wancang
Films directed by Ma-Xu Weibang
Chinese black-and-white films